The Choa Chu Kang Stadium (also known as the CCK Stadium) is part of the Choa Chu Kang Sports and Recreation complex located in Choa Chu Kang, Singapore.  The international competition standard, multi-sport facility supports a range of sports and community functions, and opened in the year 2001. The main grandstand has a capacity of 4,268 people.

The stadium itself is home to Singapore Armed Forces FC/Warriors FC during the S-league football season. The stadium has become familiar for its elegant and soaring curved white steel roof, with supporting pylons, that covers the main grandstand.

History
Choa Chu Kang stadium opened in 2001 and served as the home stadium from 2001 to 2014 and 2016 to 2018 for Warriors FC to play their S.League games.

Facilities and Structures
The football pitch itself consists of a self-watering "cell-system" turf pitch installation, supplied from Switzerland and approved by FIFA for international competition.

Other international competition standard facilities surrounding the stadium include a 50m Olympic swimming pool, a running track and athletics facilities, and a sports hall supporting indoor sports and activities.

The public can also access further outdoor facilities, such as tennis courts, petanque sandpits, street soccer pitches, as well as indoor facilities, including basketball and badminton courts, a gym and a dance training room.

The Sport Singapore operated Sports Complex also caters to local community recreational needs, with a range of fun-oriented pools, including a wave pool, waterslide, bubble pools, children's play pools.

A range of food outlets as of 2018, KFC and Pizza Hut previously occupied by Guilin Garden Restaurant, a childcare center, a sporting goods shop, and comfortable, relaxing public spaces help make this a community friendly sports and recreation facility.

Renovation works started in 2019 and is slated to be completed in 2030.

Events

Awards
Identified as an exemplary community and competition sports facility in Singapore, the Choa Chu Kang Sport Complex and Stadium won a Singapore Institute of Architects Merit Award in 2002, and a CIDB Construction Excellence Award in 2003.  The design was cited in particular for its exciting entry experience, public concourse, and use of colour, and is a representative example of the work of the architect Alex Ford, working through the local Singaporean practice Elton-Roade.

Transport
The stadium is four bus stops away from Choa Chu Kang MRT/LRT station. Visitors can take the bus 307 from the Choa Chu Kang Bus Interchange to access the stadium. It is also four bus stops away from Yew Tee MRT station.

See also
List of stadiums in Singapore

References

Warriors FC
Sports venues in Singapore
Football venues in Singapore
Rugby union stadiums in Singapore
Choa Chu Kang
Singapore Premier League venues